Midvinterblot is  the 1915 painting by Carl Larsson

Midvinterblot may also refer to:
 Midvinterblots, ancient ceremony associated with Swedish Jul (Yule) tradition
 Midvinterblot (album), a 2006 album by Swedish band Unleashed